Jorge Osmar Guarnelli (born 18 February 1952), sometimes known as just Osmar, is a Brazilian footballer who played as a defender. He competed in the men's tournament at the 1972 Summer Olympics.

References

External links
 

Living people
1952 births
Association football defenders
Brazilian footballers
Brazil international footballers
Olympic footballers of Brazil
Footballers at the 1972 Summer Olympics
Footballers from Rio de Janeiro (city)